Prasanth Varma is an Indian film director and screenwriter who works primarily in Telugu cinema. He is best known for directing Awe (2018) and Zombie Reddy (2021).

Career

2011–2017: Initial career 
Varma began his career in 2011 by directing a short film Deenamma Jeevitham. He then directed advertisement films and few short films including A Silent Melody (2014) and Dialogue in the Dark (2017). In 2015, he directed a five-episode web series Not Out starring Brian Lara. It was premiered on YuppTV.

In an interview to Idlebrain.com, he admitted that Singeetam Srinivasa Rao, Christopher Nolan, K. Viswanath and Mani Ratnam are his major influences.

2018–present: Debut in feature films, breakthrough and critical acclaim 
His first feature film was 2018  psychological cross genre film Awe (2018), although That Is Mahalakshmi was his directorial debut. Due to production issues and creative differences That is Mahalakshmi was post poned and delayed for several times. In September 2017, it was revealed that Tamannaah would work on the Telugu version of the film which would be directed by Neelakanta. Filming began on 2 November 2017. However, in January 2018, Neelakanta left the film, and was replaced by Prashanth Varma. As of 2022, the film is yet to release.

In 2017, Varma narrated his Awe story to actor Nani. Soon, it was confirmed that the film will be produced by Nani and Prashanti Tipirneni through Wall Poster Cinema. The film deals with various psychological issues and social problems like child abuse, sexual abuse, and drug abuse. Critics praised Varma's story and direction for showcasing social problems and portrayal of lesbian characters. Baradwaj Rangan stated "Awe is genuinely subversive." His next release was Kalki (2019), starring Rajasekhar and produced by C. Kalyan. The original story was written by Saitej Desharaj, like a web-series, for which Prasanth had to adapt the screenplay into a feature film format, which took him eight months to finish.

Varma's third release was Zombie Reddy (2021). It was originally scheduled for a release in 2020, but was indefinitely post-poned due to COVID-19 lockdown in India. Marketed as the first zombie film in Tollywood (Telugu cinema), it opened to positive reviews and was success full at the box-office. Sangeetha Devi Dundoo of The Hindu wrote that "In one stroke, director Prasanth Varma juxtaposes different worlds — a pandemic looming large, zombies, Rayalaseema faction rivalry — to hilarious effect" On 29 May 2021, he announced his next film Hanu Man. The film is marketed as the first Telugu superhero film. On 23 March 2022, he announced his next film with D.V.V. Danayya's son, Kalyan Dasari, titled, Adhira. Adhira, along with Hanu Man, are intended to be part of his superhero cinematic universe.

Filmography

Other works

Feature films 
 All films are in Telugu

References

External links 
 

Living people
Film directors from Andhra Pradesh
21st-century Indian film directors
People from Palakollu
Telugu film directors
Screenwriters from Andhra Pradesh
Telugu screenwriters
Indian screenwriters
Indian advertising directors
1989 births
Indian film directors